Shandong Normal University (English acronym SDNU) is a university in Jinan City, Shandong Province, China. It is one of the earliest institutions of higher learning established in Shandong Province since the founding of the People's Republic of China.

History
Predecessor schools of teachers education in Shandong date back to 1902. The university itself was established in 1950 and was known as Shandong Normal College until 1981. The new campus welcomed the first batch of students in 2005.

Campus and Statistics 
The university has two campuses, covering an area of 250 hectares. Currently there are more than 34,000 full-time Chinese students and over 200 international students enrolled. 

Qilu Culture Research Centre and Elementary Teaching Courses Research Centre at SDNU are the only two key research centers of the humanities established at provincial universities by the Ministry of Education of China (MOE).  SDNU publishes six international academic periodicals. Among them is China Population Resources & Environment, which is the only journal focusing on sustainable development in China.

SDNU has co-operative relationships with 59 universities from more than 15 countries and regions. Since 2011, it regularly employs foreign instructors for special two-week courses in English on issues relating to the web and media through the School of Communications. In 1983 SDNU was approved by the Ministry of Education of China) to recruit international students and receive international China scholarship students. And SDNU is among the HSK exam centers approved by MOE. Since then, over 5,000 international students have graduated from the university.

Notable faculty members
An Zuozhang, historian
Meigu Guan, mathematician

See also 
Attached Senior School of Shandong Normal University

External links

Shandong Normal University website 

 
Universities and colleges in Jinan
Teachers colleges in China